The Dakota Block is a three-story commercial vernacular style building built in 1916.  It is within the Downtown Historic District in Grand Forks, North Dakota.

The principal facade of the Dakota Block consists of Hebron brick laid in a running bond.  It features a single recessed bay delineated by corbelled brick and a stone cornice.  The first floor has rusticated corner piers supporting pilaster strips which extend to the top of the building.  Topping the front is a stone coping with a raised central parapet holding a name block inscribed "Dakota Block". The rear and sides of the building are constructed of common brick and are devoid of embellishment, save for a cast iron fire escape.

References

Commercial buildings on the National Register of Historic Places in North Dakota
Commercial buildings completed in 1916
Vernacular architecture in North Dakota
National Register of Historic Places in Grand Forks, North Dakota
1916 establishments in North Dakota